Webstar may refer to:

 DJ Webstar
 Kerio Technologies WebSTAR, an HTTP server for Classic Mac OS